Jeita (also spelled Jaaita or Jaita) is a town and municipality located in the Keserwan District of the  Keserwan-Jbeil Governorate of Lebanon. It has an average elevation of 380 meters above sea level and a total land area of 290 hectares. 
Jeita's inhabitants are Maronites.

It is well known for the Jeita Grotto which is a popular tourist attraction, as well as the Nahr al-Kalb, a river that runs from a spring near the grotto emptying into the Mediterranean Sea. The name Jeita is derived from the Aramaic word Ge’itta, meaning "roar" or "noise".

History
In 1838, Eli Smith noted  Ja'ita as a village located in "Aklim el-Kesrawan, Northeast of Beirut; the chief seat of the Maronites".

References

Bibliography

External links
Jaaita, localiban

Populated places in Keserwan District
Maronite Christian communities in Lebanon